Javairô Joreno Faustino Dilrosun (born 22 June 1998) is a Dutch professional footballer who plays as a winger for Eredivisie club Feyenoord. He made an appearance for the Netherlands national team in 2018.

Club career

Youth career
Dilrosun began his youth career in 2006 at Ajax, before moving to the youth academy of English club Manchester City in 2014. In 2016, he was promoted to City's under-23 side playing in the Premier League 2.

Hertha BSC
On 3 May 2018, German club Hertha BSC signed Dilrosun from Manchester City for the 2018–19 season. He signed a four-year contract lasting until 2022.

Dilrosun made his professional debut for Hertha on 2 September 2018, coming on as a substitute in the 6th minute for the injured Karim Rekik in the Bundesliga match against Schalke 04. He assisted Ondrej Duda in the 15th minute for Hertha's opening goal, with the match finishing as a 2–0 away win. Dilrosun scored his first Bundesliga goal for the club the following matchday, opening the scoring for Hertha in the 61st minute after starting the match against VfL Wolfsburg on 15 September, which finished as a 2–2 away draw.

Loan to Bordeaux 
On 31 August 2021, Dilrosun signed for Ligue 1 club Bordeaux on a season-long loan with an option-to-buy. However, his loan was not made permanent, and he left at the end of the season.

Feyenoord 
On 11 July 2022, Eredivisie club Feyenoord announced that they had signed Dilrosun on four-year contract. On 7 August 2022, Dilrosun scored his first goal on his official debut for the club, scoring Feyenoord's third goal in a 5–2 away win against Vitesse.

International career
Dilrosun began his youth international career with the Netherlands in April 2013, beginning in the under-15 team where he appeared four times and scored once. On 29 October 2013, he made his first appearance for the under-16 team against Belgium, going on to score 6 goals in 10 appearances for the team. For the under-17 team, he was capped 14 times and scored 5 goals after his debut in September 2014 against Germany.

Dilrosun debuted for the under-19 team on 3 September 2015 against Italy, going on to score 2 goals in 15 appearances. He also appeared twice for the under-18 team in November 2015, playing against Germany and Turkey.

On 27 March 2018, he appeared for the Dutch under-20 team, scoring in a 1–3 loss against the Czech Republic. Two months later, Dilrosun made his debut for the under-21 team against Bolivia.

On 19 November 2018, he made his debut for the senior squad in a 2018–19 UEFA Nations League A game against Germany, coming on as a 45th-minute substitute for injured Ryan Babel, before he had to be substituted himself, also due to injury, 20 minutes into the second half.

Personal life
Dilrosun was born in Amsterdam, Netherlands and is of Surinamese descent.

Career statistics

Club

International

References

External links
 
 
 
 
 

1998 births
Living people
Footballers from Amsterdam
Dutch footballers
Dutch sportspeople of Surinamese descent
Association football wingers
Netherlands international footballers
Netherlands youth international footballers
Netherlands under-21 international footballers
Bundesliga players
Regionalliga players
Ligue 1 players
Eredivisie players
Hertha BSC II players
Hertha BSC players
FC Girondins de Bordeaux players
Feyenoord players
Dutch expatriate footballers
Dutch expatriate sportspeople in England
Expatriate footballers in England
Dutch expatriate sportspeople in Germany
Expatriate footballers in Germany
Dutch expatriate sportspeople in France
Expatriate footballers in France